Unexpected Business is a South Korean reality show program by tvN starring Cha Tae-hyun and Jo In-sung, who unexpectedly become the bosses of a countryside grocery store for 10 days. They take over the store's operations, such as ringing up purchases and managing inventory, and also serve simple meals and snacks.

Season 1 aired every Thursday at 20:40 (KST) from February 25, 2021 to May 6, 2021. The duo take over the reins of a general store in Woncheon-ri, Gangwon-do, which includes a kitchen and small seating space for customers and local residents to dine, rest and socialise.

Season 2 premiered on February 17, 2022 and aired every Thursday at 20:40 (KST) as well. This time, the duo are in charge of a larger supermarket in Gongsan-myeon, South Jeolla-do, selling a wider variety of goods. It also has a bigger dining area and a butchery section, presenting new challenges to the experienced duo.

Guests
Various celebrities visit the store as "part-time workers" to help Cha Tae-hyun and Jo In-sung, many of whom are friends or former co-stars personally invited by the two main cast.

Season 1 (2021)

Season 2 (2022)

Ratings

Season 1 (2021)

Season 2 (2022)

Awards and nominations

Notes

References

External links
  

South Korean reality television series
2021 South Korean television series debuts
Korean-language television shows
South Korean television shows